Bhutto most often refers to:
 Bhutto (clan), a Pakistan social group
 Bhutto family, a political family in Sindh, Pakistan
 Benazir Bhutto (1953–2007), Pakistani prime minister
 Zulfikar Ali Bhutto (1928–1979), Pakistani barrister and prime minister

Bhutto may also refer to:
 Ameer Buksh Khan Bhutto (born 1955), Pakistani politician
 Asadullah Bhutto, incumbent Ameer of Jamaat-e-Islami Sindh
 Dua Bhutto, Pakistani politician
 Fatima Bhutto (born 1982), Pakistani writer
 Ghinwa Bhutto, Pakistani politician
 Jawaid Bhutto (1954–2019), professor and Sindhi intellectual
 Mahreen Razaque Bhutto, Pakistani politician
 Mumtaz Bhutto (1933–2021), Pakistani politician
 Murtaza Bhutto (1954–1996), Pakistani politician
 Muzafar Bhutto (1970–2012), Sindhi nationalist politician
 Nusrat Bhutto (1929–2011), Pakistani Iranian-Kurdish public figure
 Shah Nawaz Bhutto (1888–1957), politician in British India
 Shahid Hussain Bhutto, Pakistani politician
 Shahnawaz Bhutto (1958–1985),son of Zulfikar Ali Bhutto
 Wahid Baksh Bhutto (1898–1931), Indian politician